Cryptoscaphus is a genus of beetles in the family Carabidae, containing the following species:

 Cryptoscaphus lissonotus Chaudoir, 1855
 Cryptoscaphus russoi Gi. Muller, 1942

References

Scaritinae